Ernst Baier (27 September 1905 in Zittau, Saxony, Germany – 8 July 2001 in Garmisch, Bavaria, Germany) was a German figure skater who competed in pair skating and single skating. He became Olympic pair champion in 1936 together with Maxi Herber. The duo also won several World and European championships.

Ernst Baier skated for the club Berliner SC. He also enjoyed success as a single skater. He won silver at European, World and Olympic games in singles.

Maxi Herber and Ernst Baier revolutionized pair skating by performing the first side by side jumps in competition.

After the Second World War they skated in ice revues. Later the couple owned a business.

Maxi Herber and Ernst Baier married after their skating career in 1940. They had 3 children. In 1964 they were divorced.

On 15 May 1965 he married the Swedish figure skater Birgitta Wennström (born 10 November 1935 in Enskede, Stockholm, Sweden) known by the stage name "Topsy" from Holiday on Ice together with her partner Steve. They had a daughter in 1968, but divorced in 1973.

Some years later he remarried Maxi Herber, but they later divorced again.

Results
(men's singles)

(pairs with Maxi Herber)

Further reading
 E.R. Hall & T.D. Richardson – Champions all: camera studies by E.R. Hall (Frederick Muller, 1938)
 Richardson T.D – Modern Figure Skating (Methuen, 1938)

External links

Navigation

1905 births
2001 deaths
German male pair skaters
German male single skaters
Figure skaters at the 1932 Winter Olympics
Figure skaters at the 1936 Winter Olympics
Olympic figure skaters of Germany
Olympic gold medalists for Germany
Olympic silver medalists for Germany
Olympic medalists in figure skating
World Figure Skating Championships medalists
European Figure Skating Championships medalists
Medalists at the 1936 Winter Olympics
People from Zittau
Sportspeople from Saxony